The Bergamasque Alps and Prealps (Alpi e Prealpi Bergamasche in Italian) are a mountain range in the southern part of the Alps. They are located in Lombardy, in the northern part of Italy.

Geography
Administratively the range belongs to the Italian province of Bergamo and, marginally, to the provinces of Sondrio, Lecco and Brescia.

The western slopes of the mountains are drained by the Adda, the central and western part of the range by Oglio and other minor rivers and streams, all of them tributaries of the Po .

SOIUSA classification
According to SOIUSA (International Standardized Mountain Subdivision of the Alps) the mountain range is an Alpine section, classified in the following way:
 main part = Eastern Alps
 major sector = Southern Limestone Alps
 section = Bergamasque Alps and Prealps
 code = II/C-29

Borders
Bergamasque Alps and Prealps' borders are (clockwise):
 Como lake (west);
 river Adda, Aprica pass and Corteno valley (north);
 val Camonica and Iseo lake (east);
 Po Plain (south).

Subdivision
The Bergamasque Alps and Prealps are subdivided in two subsections:
 Bergamo Alps (IT: Alpi Orobie) - SOIUSA code: II/C-29.I,
 Bergamasque Prealps (IT: Prealpi Bergamasche)- SOIUSA code: II/C-29.II,
which are divided by some secondary valleys of Val Brembana, Val Seriana and Val Camonica: Valsassina, Valtorta, Val Secca, Valcanale, Val Nembo, Val di Scalve and Val Paisco.

Notable summits

Some notable summits of the range are:

References

Maps
 Italian official cartography (Istituto Geografico Militare - IGM); on-line version: www.pcn.minambiente.it

Mountain ranges of the Alps
Mountain ranges of Lombardy
Province of Brescia
Province of Bergamo
Province of Sondrio
Province of Lecco

de:Bergamasker Alpen
es:Alpes y Prealpes Bergamasco
fr:Alpes bergamasques
nl:Bergamasker Alpen
nn:Dei bergamaskiske Alpane
pl:Alpy Bergamskie
ro:Alpii Bergamezi